Alice Mills may refer to:
Alice Tait (née Mills), swimmer from Australia
Alice Mills (photographer), photographer from Australia
Alice du Pont Mills, American aviator, thoroughbred race horse breeder and owner, and philanthropist